Borzia is a genus of cyanobacteria.

The genus name of Borzia is in honour of Antonino Borzì (1852–1921), was an Italian botanist. It was published in Jahres-Ber. Schles. Ges. Vaterl. Kult. Vol.60 on page 227 in 1883.

References

Cyanobacteria genera
Oscillatoriales